Simone is an Italian surname. The surname was first recorded in the year 1346, and is believed to be the Italian equivalent of Simon

Origins and etymology 
The name Simone ultimately originates as a variant of Shimeon which is Hebrew for "one who harkens".

Variants and similar surnames 
Popular variants of this surname include Simonetti, Simoni, Simioni, Desimone among several others.

Popularity of name

According to United States Census data taken in the year 2000, there were approximately 7,040 people in the United States with this surname. Thus ranking Simone as the 4,607th in terms of most popular surnames.

Notable people with the surname Simone 

Some of the most notable people with the surname Simone include: 
 
 Afric Simone (born 1956), a Mozambique singer and musician
 Albert J. Simone (born 1935), a former president of the Rochester Institute of Technology, Rochester, New York
 Andrew Simone (born 1938), a Canadian dermatologist
 Domonique Simone (born 1971), an American adult actress
 Franco Simone (born 1949), an Italian singer and songwriter, composer and television host
 Gail Simone (born 1974), an American comic book writer
 Hannah Simone (born 1980), a Canadian actress and television host
 Kirsten Simone, a Danish ballerina
 Marco Simone (born 1969), a former Italian football player
 Nina Simone (1933–2003), an American singer and songwriter
 Simuna (or Simona), a Jewish Talmudist Savora sage

References

Italian-language surnames
Patronymic surnames